Bulbophyllum ceratostylis is a species of orchid in the genus Bulbophyllum, which found in Sabah Borneo and Sumatra.

References
The Bulbophyllum-Checklist
The Internet Orchid Species Photo Encyclopedia

ceratostylis